CUS Genova Hockey is an Italian field hockey club based in Genoa, Italy. The club was formed in 1947 changing name from GIL ("Gioventù Italiana del Littorio", which means "Italian Youth of Littorio") and it won three Italian scudettos in 1949, 1951 and 1954.

External links 
 Official site

Italian field hockey clubs
Sport in Genoa
Field hockey clubs established in 1947
1947 establishments in Italy
Genoa